Biblical law refers to the legal aspects of the Bible, the holy scriptures of Judaism and Christianity.

Judaism
 Law of Moses
 Mitzvah, divine commandment
 The Ten Commandments
 613 commandments
 Seven Laws of Noah, laws applicable to all of humanity, including non-Jews

Christianity
 Abrogation of Old Covenant laws
 Christian views on the Old Covenant, term referring to the theological discussion of the applicability of Hebrew Bible law in a Christian context
 Cafeteria Christianity, a derogatory term used to accuse other Christian individuals or denominations of selecting which Christian doctrines they will follow, and which they will not
 Evangelical counsels, or counsels of perfection in Christianity are chastity, poverty (or perfect charity), and obedience
 Expounding of the Law by Jesus, according to the Gospel of Matthew
 The Great Commandment
 Law and Gospel, the relationship between God's Law and the Gospel of Jesus Christ is a major topic in Lutheran and Reformed theology
 Law of Christ, an undefined Pauline phrase whose meaning is disputed by different Christian denominations
 The New Commandment of Jesus, according to the Gospel of John
 The Pauline privilege regarding marriage
 The rule of faith of Paul the Apostle
 The Sermon on the Mount provides moral precepts that often extend beyond mere external, legal compliance.
 The unforgivable sin
 The New Testament household code, instructions in the New Testament writings of the apostles Paul and Peter to pairs of Christian people in different domestic and civil structures of society

Theology
 Antinomianism, general term used for the opposition to biblical laws
 Divine law, any law that is understood as deriving from a transcendent source, such as the will of God or gods, in contrast to man-made law
 Theonomy, a hypothetical form of government based on divine law

 
Jewish ethics
Philosophy of law